Lake Major is a rural community of the Halifax Regional Municipality in the Canadian province of Nova Scotia.

The Lake

Lake Major is among the deepest lakes in Nova Scotia, with a maximum depth of 60 m. The lake also serves as the water supply for the former City of Dartmouth; as a result, there is a water pumphouse on the southeast side of the lake.

External links
Explore HRM
Halifax Water's Website

Major
Communities in Halifax, Nova Scotia
General Service Areas in Nova Scotia